Oikonomopoulos is a Greek surname. It is often also rendered as Ikonomopoulos or Economopoulos. The feminine form is Oikonomopoulou (Οικονομοπούλου). It may refer to:

Aikaterini Oikonomopoulou (born 1978), Greek water polo player
Charalambos Economopoulos (born 1991), Greek football player
Costaki Economopoulos (born 1969), Greek-American stand-up comedian
Eleni Oikonomopoulou (1912–1999), Greek artist
Nikos Economopoulos (born 1953), Greek photographer
Takis Oikonomopoulos (born 1943), Greek football coach

Greek-language surnames
Occupational surnames